San Tirso is one of eleven parishes (administrative divisions)  in Candamo, a municipality within the province and autonomous community of Asturias, in northern Spain. 

Villages
 Otero
 Villa 
 San Tirso

References  

Parishes in Candamo